The 1997 Central American and Caribbean Championships in Athletics  were held in San Juan, Puerto Rico between 26–28 June.

Medal summary

Men's events

Women's events

Medal table

External links
Men Results – GBR Athletics
Women Results – GBR Athletics

Central American and Caribbean Championships in Athletics
Central American and Caribbean Championships
Central American and Caribbean Championships
Sports in San Juan, Puerto Rico
1997 CAC Championships